USS Quail (AM-377/MSF-377) was an  acquired by the United States Navy for the dangerous task of removing mines from minefields laid in the water to prevent ships from passing.

Quail was named after the "quail," a migratory game bird.

It was the second ship in the U.S. Navy to be named USS Quail, and was laid down by the Savannah Machine and Foundry Co., Savannah, Georgia, 12 April 1944; launched 20 August 1944; sponsored by Miss Vivian Rahn; and commissioned 5 March 1945.

Pacific Ocean operations
After fitting out and shakedown, Quail got underway 10 May for Guantanamo Bay, Cuba, to conduct antisubmarine exercises. She then transited the Panama Canal to arrive in San Diego, California. She departed for the Pacific Ocean theater of operation on 4 June, arriving Saipan on 28 August, where she was assigned to the Marianas Group.
 
Quail sailed for Okinawa, arriving 19 September, and then for Wakayama Wan, south coast of Honshū, Japan. She conducted minesweeping operations in the Pacific Ocean until 4 April 1946, when she reported for inactivation at San Diego, California.

Decommissioning 
Decommissioned, Quail later returned to active duty with the U.S. Atlantic Fleet. Redesignated MSF-377, 7 February 1955, she was placed out of commission, in reserve, and berthed at Green Cove Springs, Florida, 12 August 1955. She was struck from the Naval Vessel Register 1 December 1966, and was disposed of by scrapping.

Awards 
Quail received one battle star for World War II service.

References

External links 
 
 Ships of the U.S. Navy, 1940-1945 AM-377 USS Quail
 USS Quail (AM 377)

 

Auk-class minesweepers of the United States Navy
Ships built in Savannah, Georgia
1944 ships
World War II minesweepers of the United States